Headland is a civil parish in the borough of Hartlepool, County Durham, in the North East of England. The parish covers old Hartlepool and nearby villages.

History

The Heugh Battery, one of three constructed to protect the port of Hartlepool in 1860, is located in the area along with a museum.

The area made national headlines in July 1994 in connection with the murder of Rosie Palmer, a local toddler.

On 19 March 2002 the Time Team searched for an Anglo-Saxon monastery.

See also
 St Mary's Church, Hartlepool

References

External links

Civil parishes in County Durham
Hartlepool